Um Vichet (born 27 November 1993) is a Cambodian footballer who plays for Phnom Penh Crown in the Cambodian Premier League and the Cambodia national team. His younger brother Um Sereyroth is also a footballer who also plays as a goalkeeper.

International career
Vichet made his senior debut in the 2012 AFF Suzuki Cup qualification phase against Brunei.

Honours

Club
National Defense Ministry
Hun Sen Cup: 2010, 2016
Phnom Penh Crown
Cambodian League: 2021

References

External links 

Living people
1993 births
Cambodian footballers
Cambodia international footballers
Phnom Penh Crown FC players
Sportspeople from Phnom Penh
Association football goalkeepers